The 1930 Louisiana Normal Demons football team represented the Louisiana State Normal College (now known as Northwestern State University) as a member the Southern Intercollegiate Athletic Association (SIAA) during the 1930 college football season. Led by 17-year head coach H. Lee Prather, the Colonels compiled an overall record of 7–2, with a mark of 4–1 in conference play.

Schedule

References

Louisiana Normal
Northwestern State Demons football seasons
Louisiana Normal Demons football